The 2013 Asia-Pacific Rally Championship season is an international rally championship sanctioned by the FIA. The championship is contested by a combination of regulations with Group N competing directly against Super 2000 cars for points. A new rally was added to the calendar, the first since Rally of Queensland in 2009, in the Thailand Rally.

Indian driver Gaurav Gill won the Asian-Pacific championship after many years in the series. Gill won the championship despite his Finnish team mate Esapekka Lappi winning more events. Gill wrapped the title up early as the only rival outside of the Team MRF squad, Subaru driver Sanjay Takle, did not attend the final round at the China Rally.

Australian driver Simon Knowles won the Pacific Cup held over the three Pacific ocean events. The Asia Cup was held over three of the four Asian events, with the China Rally being left out in favour of candidate rally, the Thailand Rally. The Asia Cup was won by New Zealand driver Michael Young.

Race calendar and results

The 2013 APRC is as follows:

Championship standings
The 2013 APRC for Drivers points is as follows:

Note: 1 – 12 refers to the bonus points awarded for each leg of the rally for the first five place getters, 1st (7), 2nd (5), 3rd (3), 4th (2), 5th (1). There are two bonus legs for each rally.

Pacific Cup

Asia Cup

References

External links
Official website
APRC Live Podcast
APRC News and Video

Asia-Pacific Rally Championship seasons
Asia-Pacific
Asia-Pacific
Asia-Pacific